Éric Genetet is a French writer. He was born in 1967. His published works include Solo, Le Fiancé de la lune, Et n’attendre personne and Tomber (winner of the prix Folire and the prix de la Ville de Belfort (2016).

He divides his time between Strasbourg and Paris.

References

French writers
1967 births
Living people
Date of birth missing (living people)